The Hong Kong Institute of Planners (HKIP) is a professional body for town planners in Hong Kong. It officially began operation in 1978. It became a statutory body in 1991 when the Legislative Council  enacted the Hong Kong Institute of Planners Incorporation Ordinance.

Focus
The institute is involved in accreditation of urban planning professionals, advisory on urban issues, and education in the field. It is also a medium for networking between urban planning professionals in Hong Kong. Membership is an accepted qualification for work in the Hong Kong government as well as the private sector.

The institute is one of the constituent institutes of the Architectural, Surveying and Planning functional constituency for the Legislative Council elections.

See also

Architecture of Hong Kong
Hong Kong Institute of Architects
Hong Kong Institute of Urban Design

References

External links
 

1978 establishments in Hong Kong
Architecture in Hong Kong
Professional associations based in Hong Kong
Urban planning in Hong Kong
Organizations established in 1978
Professional planning institutes
Statutory bodies in Hong Kong